Teișani is a commune in Prahova County, Muntenia, Romania. It is composed of five villages: Bughea de Sus, Olteni, Ștubeiu, Teișani and Valea Stâlpului.

References

Communes in Prahova County
Localities in Muntenia